Anthene lacides, the delicate ciliate blue, is a butterfly in the family Lycaenidae. It is found in Nigeria (south and the Cross River loop), Cameroon, Gabon, the Republic of the Congo, Angola and the Democratic Republic of the Congo (Tshopo).

References

Butterflies described in 1874
Anthene
Butterflies of Africa
Taxa named by William Chapman Hewitson